Tropidia territorialis, commonly known as the striped crown orchid, is an evergreen, terrestrial plant with between three and six thin, pleated, dark green leaves and up to twenty crowded, green and white flowers. It is only known from about five places in the Northern Territory, Australia.

Description
The leaves have five prominent veins. The lateral sepals are a similar size to the dorsal sepal and are joined to each other for half their length then spread widely apart. The petals are about the same size as the sepals. Flowering occurs between December and January.

Taxonomy and naming
Tropidia territorialis was first formally described in 2004 by David Jones and Mark Clements and the description was published in The Orchadian.

Distribution and habitat
The striped crown is only known from about five locations in monsoon rainforest in the Northern Territory including on Groote Eylandt.

References

territorialis
Plants described in 2004
Terrestrial orchids
Orchids of the Northern Territory